NBL1 is a semi-professional basketball league in Australia, comprising South, North, Central and West Conferences with both men's and women's competitions.

Current clubs 

* Teams that transferred from the South East Australian Basketball League (SEABL).

** Teams that transferred from the Queensland Basketball League (QBL).

*** Teams that transferred from the Premier League (South Australia).

**** Teams that transferred from the Big V (Victoria).

***** Teams that transferred from the State Basketball League (SBL).

Former and defunct clubs

See also

List of basketball clubs in Australia
List of current NBL team rosters
List of current WNBL team rosters

References

External links

NBL1
NBL1
NBL1